Rolf Kukowitsch was a German football coach who managed several clubs in East Germany.

References

Year of birth missing
Possibly living people
East German football managers
Dynamo Dresden managers
Chemnitzer FC managers
FC Erzgebirge Aue managers